Paul Augustin Jean Larrouy was a French diplomat born in Lagardelle-sur-Leze in France on 1 January 1857 and who died in Buenos Aires on 10 August 1906. 
Notably, he has been Résident Général in second in Madagascar from March 1888 until 12 December 1889, and in his second term Résident Général in Madagascar from October 1892 until 1894.

Action in Madagascar 

Paul Augustin Jean Larrouy's role during his second stay in Madagascar as General Resident was to maintain the French Authority without losing face in front of a non-abiding Malagasy power supported by England. The Malagasy government was confronted to a Menalamba revolt against the agreements signed with France in 1885 by the queen Ranavalona III. He leaves Tananarive at his request in 1894, and is succeeded by Charles Le Myre de Vilers. After the stay of the later, France decides a complete annexation of Madagascar in 1896 and call General Joseph Gallieni as Resident and First Madagascar governor

Assignments 

After graduating with a law degree (doctorat de Droit) Paul Augustin Jean Larrouy has had a very rich diplomatic career started in 1873 as chancery clerk in Buenos Aires and finished in Buenos Aires as Ambassador and Plenipotentiary Minister. He climbed the ladder following his various assignments in South America, in Europe, in Asia, and in Africa. He is sent in Japan (Yokohama) in 1882 and is secretary to the International conference for revision of Treaties with Japan.

In Africa he performed several missions related to the French Colonial expansion: In Sub-Saharan Africa, (Envoy of the French Government to the conference related to the delimitation of French and English spheres of influence in the Niger region in February 1896), and in Madagascar, starting 17 August 1887 as a Résident Général in second then from 19 August 1892 as Résident Général in Tananarive to the Queen Ranavalona III.

While in Argentina as Extraordinary envoy and plenipotentiary minister in his last rotation, he met Jean-Baptiste Charcot who was preparing his expedition to Antarctica between 1903 and 1905. He became one of the sponsor of the expedition. Charcot gave his name to Larrouy Island a newly found island located 65°52′S et 65° 15′W7.

References

External links 
 Leonore data base of the French Légion d'honneur 
 web site of French foreign affairs : Topic Madagascar 
 Annuaire diplomatique et consulaire de la République Française, Volume 1896 

People from Haute-Garonne
Colonial Governors of French Madagascar
1857 births
1906 deaths
Ambassadors of France to Peru
19th-century French diplomats
20th-century French diplomats